Jack Charles Barley (4 December 1887 – 26 October 1956) was an English cricketer and a British Colonial Service administrator. A right-handed batsman and wicket-keeper, he played four first-class matches, all for different teams. He scored 12 runs in eight innings and made five dismissals: one stumping and four catches.

Cricket career
His debut came for Sussex against Cambridge University in 1908; he had a quiet match, taking only one catch and scoring 0 and 1 with the bat. The following year he played for HDG Leveson-Gower's XI against Oxford University, for Worcestershire against the same opposition, and finally for Oxford University against Surrey.

Barley has one minor claim to fame: he shared in Worcestershire's record eleventh-wicket partnership – albeit one of just 9 – with Maurice Jewell in their 12-a-side match against Oxford University.

Colonial administrator
He joined the administration of the British Western Pacific Territories after leaving Oxford University in 1911. Barley was appointed to work in the civil service in the Solomon Islands, as District Officer at Tulagi, before succeeding Arthur Grimble as the British Resident Commissioner in the Gilbert and Ellice Islands from 18 October 1933. Barley's tenure ended officially in December 1941 following the Japanese occupation of the Gilbert Islands, however Ronald Garvey had replaced him as Acting Resident Commissioner from 1938 to 1939. 
Then Cyril George Fox Cartwright was acting Resident Commissioner until Vivian Fox-Strangways took up his appointment as Resident Commissioner.

Barley died at Surfers Paradise, Queensland, Australia on 26 October 1956.

References

External links
Jack Barley at ESPNcricinfo
Jack Barley at CricketArchive

1887 births
1956 deaths
People from Eton, Berkshire
People educated at Tonbridge School
Alumni of St John's College, Oxford
English cricketers
Sussex cricketers
Worcestershire cricketers
Oxford University cricketers
British Solomon Islands people
Governors of the Gilbert and Ellice Islands
H. D. G. Leveson Gower's XI cricketers
Wicket-keepers